Nigilgia limata is a moth in the family Brachodidae. It was described by Alexey Diakonoff and Yutaka Arita in 1979. It is found on the Ryukyu Islands of Japan and in Taiwan.

References

Brachodidae
Moths described in 1979